Monastiraki is a flea market in Greece.

Monastiraki may also refer to:
 Monastiraki, Argolis
 Monastiraki, Crete, an ancient Minoan town on Crete
 Monastiraki station, interchange station of the Athens Metro